Garobigha Halt railway station is a halt railway station on Gaya–Kiul line of Delhi–Kolkata Main Line in East Central Railway zone under Danapur railway division of the Indian Railways. The railway station is situated at Dhanwan in Nawada district in the Indian state of Bihar.

References 

Railway stations in Nawada district
Danapur railway division
Railway stations in India opened in 1879